Svelgen is the administrative centre of Bremanger Municipality in Vestland county, Norway. The village is located at the eastern end of the Nordgulen fjord and at the mouth of the Svelgselva river.

Prior to 1912, the area had no name, other than calling it the end of the Nordgulen fjord or by some of the three local farms.  In 1912, the village area was named Svelgen, after the nearby river Svelgselva. Since 1917, a large smelting plant in Svelgen has been a cornerstone business for the village. The plant is currently owned by Elkem.  Svelgen Chapel is the local church—part of the national Church of Norway.

References

Villages in Vestland
Bremanger